The 921st Expeditionary Air Refueling Squadron is a provisional United States Air Force unit. Its last known active period ended on 12 November 2011 at Moron Air Base, Spain.

The squadron was first activated in 1942 as the 21st Photographic Reconnaissance Squadron in 1942 at Peterson Field, Colorado. It served in combat in the China Burma India Theater as part of the Fourteenth Air Force.  After the war, the squadron served as the 21st Reconnaissance Squadron with the Air Force Reserve at Stewart Air Force Base, New York from 1947 until 1949, but does not appear to have been fully manned or equipped.

The 921st Air Refueling Squadron was activated in 1960 at Altus Air Force Base, Oklahoma to serve as an air refueling squadron for dispersed Boeing B-52 Stratofortresses.  However, the decision to activate the squadron was reversed shortly thereafter and its personnel and equipment were returned to the squadron that had provided its cadre.

In September 1985, the 921st Air Refueling Squadron and the 21st Reconnaissance Squadron were consolidated into a single unit.  The squadron was subsequently converted to provisional status and designated the 921st Expeditionary Air Refueling Squadron.

History

World War II

The squadron was first activated as the 21st Photographic Reconnaissance Squadron in September 1942 at Peterson Field, Colorado, but apparently was not fully manned until December. It trained there until April 1943, when the squadron was reassigned from the 5th Photographic Group and began its overseas movement. The squadron arrived in India in June and began deploying flights to China the following month. It served as an umbrella organization for Fourteenth Air Force reconnaissance operations in China. The squadron deployed detached flights of reconnaissance aircraft, (mostly specially equipped Lockheed F-5 Lightnings] and North American F-4 and F-6 Mustangs), which flew combat reconnaissance missions over Japanese-held territory from numerous forward airstrips.  Squadron detachments flew missions over India, Burma, Thailand, French Indochina, Hainan Island, Formosa, Shanghai, China, the Philippines, Japan and Korea. Flight A of the squadron also performed mapping missions over Thailand and Burma. The squadron redeployed from China at the end of 1945 and was inactivated at Fort Lawton, Washington, at the beginning of 1946.

Air Force reserve
The squadron was redesignated the 21st Reconnaissance Squadron and reactivated as a reserve unit under Air Defense Command (ADC) on 1 October 1947 at Stewart Air Force Base, New York. In 1948 Continental Air Command (ConAC) assumed responsibility for managing reserve and Air National Guard units from ADC. At Stewart, the squadron trained under ConAC's 2232d Air Force Reserve Training Center, but does not appear to have been fully equipped. President Truman’s reduced 1949 defense budget also required reductions in the number of units in the Air Force, and the 21st was inactivated in June 1949 and not replaced as reserve flying operations at Stewart ceased.

Strategic Air Command
The 921st Air Refueling Squadron was one of two air refueling squadrons activated in 1960 at Altus Air Force Base, Oklahoma for movement to other bases to provide Boeing KC-135 Stratotanker support to dispersed Boeing B-52 Stratofortress bombers.  Cadre and aircraft for the squadron was drawn from the 96th Air Refueling Squadron, which was inactivated The decision to organize squadrons at Altus for movement elsewhere was reversed shortly after the 921st was organized, and the squadron was inactivated and its personnel and aircraft were returned to the 96th, which was reactivated.

The 921st Air Refueling Squadron and the 21st Reconnaissance Squadron were consolidated in September 1985. The consolidated squadron was redesignated the 921st Expeditionary Air Refueling Squadron and converted to provisional status.

Expeditionary operations
In 2011, the 921st Expeditionary Air Refueling Squadron was deployed in support of Operation Unified Protector, serving at Moron Air Base, Spain, until November 2011. The squadron was NATO's largest tanker squadron composed of active duty, Air National Guard and Air Force Reserve Command KC-135 and KC-10 aircrews. The squadron executed over 1,000 combat missions to enforce the United Nations No Fly Zone over Libya.

The AMC wing at Moron was the 313th Air Expeditionary Wing and it appears that the 921 EARS served under this wing. James B. Dermer served as squadron commander for a period in 2011 at Moron, who was then succeeded by Lt. Col. Phil Heseltine who was squadron commander from August to October 2011.

Lineage
21st Reconnaissance Squadron
 Constituted as the 21st Photographic Reconnaissance Squadron on 14 July 1942
 Activated on 2 September 1942
 Redesignated 21st Photographic Squadron (Light) on 6 February 1943
 Redesignated 21st Photographic Reconnaissance Squadron on 13 November 1943
 Inactivated on 6 January 1946
 Redesignated the 21st Reconnaissance Squadron, Photographic on 11 March 1947 and allotted to the reserve
 Activated on 1 October 1947
 Inactivated on 27 June 1949
 Consolidated with the 921st Air Refueling Squadron as the 921st Air Refueling Squadron on 19 September 1985.

921st Expeditionary Air Refueling Squadron
 Constituted as the 921st Air Refueling Squadron on 20 May 1960
 Activated on 1 October 1960
 Inactivated on 15 December 1960
 Consolidated with the 21st Reconnaissance Squadron on 19 September 1985.
 Redesignated 921st Expeditionary Air Refueling Squadron on 12 June 2002
 Activated by August 2011
 Inactivated on 12 November 2011

Assignments
 5th Photographic Group (later 5th Photographic Reconnaissance and Mapping Group), 2 September 1942
 Fourteenth Air Force, June 1943 – 6 January 1946
 74th Reconnaissance Group, 1 October 1947 – 27 June 1949
 11th Bombardment Wing, 1 October 1960 – 15 December 1960
 Air Mobility Command to activate or inactivate as needed, 12 June 2002
 Unknown August 2011 – 12 November 2011

Stations
 Army Air Base, Colorado Springs (later Peterson Field), Colorado, 2 September 1942 – 27 April 1943
 Bishnupur Airfield, India, 27 June 1943
 Flights at Kunming Airport, China, 12 July 1943 – 22 August 1943 and Kweilin Airfield, China, 12 July 1943 – 12 September 1944)
 Kunming Airport, China, 22 August 1943
 Flights at Suichwan Airfield, China, 26 October 1943 – 26 June 1944 and ca. 12 November 1944 – 22 January 1945, Liangshan Airfield, China, April 1944 – 18 October 1944, Kanchow Airfield, China, August 1944 – 20 November 1944, Liuchow Airfield, China,, 10 September 1944 – 6 November 1944, Hanchung Airfield, China, 18 October 1944 – 13 August 1945, Luliang Airfield, China, ca. 26 November 1944 – 13 May 1945, Hsian Airfield, China, 5 February 1945 – ca. 5 October 1945, Laifeng Airfield, China, 7 May 1945 – 16 August 1945, Shwangliu Airfield, China, 14 May 1945, Ankang Airfield, China, 25 June 1945 – ca. 5 October 1945, and Chihkiang Airfield, China, 16 August 2045 – ca. 15 October 1945
 Hanchow Airfield, China, 18 October 1945 – ca. 15 December 1945
 Fort Lawton, Washington, 5 – 6 January 1946
 Stewart Air Force Base, New York, 1 October 1947 – 27 June 1949
 Altus Air Force Base, Oklahoma, 1 October 1960 – 15 December 1960
 Moron Air Base, Spain, by August 2011 – 12 November 2011

Aircraft

 North American F-4 (P-51 Mustang), 1943–1945
 Lockheed F-5 (P-38 Lighting), 1943–1945
 North American F-6 (P-51 Mustang), 1943–1945
 Curtiss P-40 Warhawk, 1943–1944
 North American B-25 Mitchell, 1945
 Boeing KC-135A Stratoranker, 1960

Campaigns

See also
 List of P-38 Lightning operators
 List of United States Air Force air refueling squadrons

References

Notes

Bibliography

Further reading

External links
 Tribute page to the 21st PRS

Air refueling squadrons of the United States Air Force